Mount Vernon City School District is a public school district serving students Mount Vernon in Knox County, Ohio. It oversees Mount Vernon High School, Mount Vernon Middle School, Columbia Elementary, Dan Emmett Elementary, East Elementary, Pleasant Street Elementary, Twin Oak Elementary, and Wiggin Street Elementary. The district received national attention when the board voted to fire John Freshwater for branding a student with a Christian cross and teaching creationism.

References

External links
Mount Vernon City School District  – Official website

School districts in Ohio
Education in Knox County, Ohio